Daugaard is a Danish surname. Notable people with the surname include:

Dennis Daugaard (born 1953), American politician
Kim Daugaard (born 1974), Danish football player and manager
Line Daugaard (born 1978), Danish handball player
Lisa Daugaard, American criminal reform activist
Rasmus Daugaard (born 1976), Danish footballer

Danish-language surnames